This article shows past squads from the Puerto Rican professional volleyball team Gigantes de Carolina from the Liga de Voleibol Superior Femenino.

2010
 Head Coach:  Arcángel Ruíz
 Assistant coach:  Felipe Ralat

Release or Transfer

2009
 Head Coach:  Javier Gaspar
 Assistant coach:  Angel Peña

Release or Transfer

2007

 Head Coach:  Luis E. Ruiz
 Assistant coach:  Steven Fenosic

Release or Transfer

References

External links
 Pinkin Corozal Official Site

Gigantes